Adam Abdu-Kafarati (1954 – 2021) was a Nigerian jurist. He was the Chief Judge of the Federal High Court of Nigeria.

Early life and education 
Justice Kafarati was born in 1954 in Kwami, a local government area of Gombe State. He attended Kafarati Primary School between January 1962 to December 1968. He attended Government Secondary School, Gombe between 1969 to 1973. He also attended the Northeast College of Arts & Science (NECAS), Maiduguri between October 1973 to June 1975. He studied Law at the Ahmadu Bello University, Zaria from October 1975 to June 1978 and he graduated from the Nigerian Law School, Lagos in 1979.

Career 
He began his career after his National Youth Service Corps (NYSC) programme as a State Counsel II at the Bauchi State Ministry of Justice. He became the Principal State Counsel in 1987, served as Assistant Administrator-General before he was appointed a judge of the Federal High Court on October 31, 1991, he was inaugurated as the Acting Chief Judge of the Federal High Court on September 16, 2017, and eventually became the chief judge of the court on June 7, 2018. Adam Abdu-Kafarati retired 13 months later clocking the mandatory retirement age of 65 on July 25, 2019.

Death 
Justice Adamu Abdu Kafarati died on February 25, 2021, around 7:30 pm after his usual evening Magrib Prayer in Abuja.

References 

1954 births
2021 deaths
Nigerian jurists
People from Gombe State